Drogheda MacBride railway station serves Drogheda in County Louth, Ireland.

Description
The present station is located on a sharp curve on the southern approach to the Boyne Viaduct.  Formerly there were three lines through the station between the 'up' and 'down' platforms, but when the station was refurbished in 1997, the up platform line was removed and the platform widened.

It was given the name MacBride on Sunday 10 April 1966 in commemoration of John MacBride, one of the executed leaders of the Easter Rising of 1916.

History

The original Drogheda station opened on 25 May 1844 about a quarter mile southeast.
The passenger station was resited when the first temporary Boyne Viaduct opened on 11 May 1853.

The former GNR(I) branch to Oldcastle (opened to Navan in 1850; throughout 1863) diverges from the Dublin-Belfast mainline immediately south of the station.
This serves Irish Cement at Drogheda and Tara Mine near Navan.

Gallery

See also
 List of railway stations in Ireland

References

External links 

 Irish Rail Drogheda Station Website
 Eiretrains - Drogheda Station

Buildings and structures in Drogheda
Iarnród Éireann stations in County Louth
Railway stations in County Louth
Railway stations opened in 1844
Railway stations served by Enterprise
Transport in Drogheda
Drogheda
Railway stations in the Republic of Ireland opened in 1844